William Carney may refer to:
 William Harvey Carney (1840–1908), American Civil War soldier, the first African American to be awarded the Medal of Honor
 William A. Carney (1860–1904), American labor unionist
 Bill Carney (1874–1938), baseball outfielder
 William E. Carney (1878–1948), Massachusetts politician and court officer
 William J. Carney (1927–2010), American politician in Ohio
 William Carney (politician) (1942–2017), U.S. Representatives from New York